Karinainen is a former municipality of Finland. It was merged to Pöytyä in the beginning of 2005.

It was located in the province of Western Finland and was part of the Southwest Finland region. The municipality had a population of 2,457 (2004) and covered an area of 92.41 km² of which 0.09 km² was water. The population density was 26.73 inhabitants per km².

The municipality was unilingually Finnish.

Former municipalities of Finland
Populated places disestablished in 2005